The architecture of Mali is a distinct subset of Sudano-Sahelian architecture indigenous to West Africa. It comprises adobe buildings such as the Great Mosque of Djenné or the University of Timbuktu. It can be found all over the Sahel region of Africa. Malian architecture developed during the Ghana Empire, which founded most of Mali's great cities. They then flourished in West Africa's two greatest civilisations the Mali Empire and the Songhai Empire.

Mosques of Mali 
Mosques are a common architectural typology and building program present in Mali. Typically, mosques consist of a prayer space and a mausoleum, merging multiple stages of life into a singular place of worship. In Malian mosque design, the organization is straightforward. These mosques consist of a basic, centralized courtyard, framed by aisles. Prayer halls are located at the ends of this courtyard. Many Malian mosques feature anthropomorphic characteristics that will interpret human bodily movements, typically mimicking praying figures and gestures. Aisles bordering the interior structure represent these bodily positions when one takes a prayer position. More specifically, the minaret represents the head. The centralized courtyard symbolizes the stomach. Galleries at the perimeter of the courtyard represent the feet. Lastly, the aisles serve as the arms.

Great Mosque of Djenné 

The Great Mosque of Djenné was first built in the 13th century. It is an example of Sudano-Sahelian style and has been an integral part of the Malian community for almost a millennium.

Timbuktu 

Timbuktu has many adobe and mud brick buildings but the most famous is the University. The masajids (mosques) of Sankore, Djinguereber, and Sidi Yahya were the centres of learning in medieval Mali and produced some of the most famous works in Africa, the Timbuktu Manuscripts.

Timbuktu is a city in Mali with very distinguishable architecture. Most of the architecture present in this region is commentary on the history and evolution of human beings. These architectural mosques are organized in a manner referencing bodily movements. Common materials used in construction are natural, earthen materials that also pay homage to its ancestral presence. The “body acts as an organizational template for a building's interior layout.” Ultimately, these architectural forms are derived from an individual level but align with the cosmos, revealing an intricate spiritual system.

Structurally speaking, the architecture has been redefined during the Sonhai reign. Protective, strong materials are utilized to protect the sun-brick adobe structures.

Architectural Materiality 
Much of the materials in Mali are derived from its natural surroundings. Many structures are composed of basic earth materials which innately have effective thermodynamic qualities. These material choices allow structures to remain cool throughout the day and hot during the night. This is possible because the earth brick will absorb heat throughout the hot period of the day, then later radiate it to the interiors as the brick cools down overnight. Then, conversely, the cool brick will radiate into the interiors throughout the day, as the brick bakes in the sun. Wooden supports protruding is also a common, defining characteristic of the architecture of Mali. It provides scaffolding for annual replastering events of Mali architecture. These sticks protruding from the larger planes also enable moisture to be wicked away from these earthen bricks.

In addition to this practicality of material choices, there is also symbolism at work. The points of structural intersection align with anatomical and spiritual ideologies present in this region.

References

 Elias N. Saad, Social History of Timbuktu: The Role of Muslim Scholars and Notables 1400–1900. Cambridge - London - New York 1985.
 Shamil Jeppie & Souleymane Bachir Diagne (eds). The Meanings of Timbuktu. HSRC Press: Cape Town, 2008
 "The University of Sankore, Timbuktu". Foundation for Science, Technology and Civilisation.